| player              = 
| prevseason          = Apertura 2018
| nextseason          = 2019–20

}}

The Clausura 2019 Copa MX was the 81st staging of the Copa MX, the 53rd staging in the professional era and is the fourteenth tournament played since the 2012 return of the competition, following its hiatus after the 1996–97 edition.

The tournament started on 8 January 2019 and ended on 10 April 2019.

The final was held at Estadio Olímpico Benito Juárez in Ciudad Juárez with the visiting team América defeating Juárez 0–1 to win their record sixth title.

As winners, América earned the right to face Cruz Azul in the 2019 Supercopa MX. However, they also won the Apertura 2018 Liga MX, and thus qualified for the 2019 Campeón de Campeones. They were replaced by the Supercopa MX title holders, Necaxa.

Participants
This tournament will feature the 14 clubs from Liga MX which will not participate in the 2019 CONCACAF Champions League (Monterrey, Santos Laguna, Toluca, and UANL).

The tournament also featured the top 13 Ascenso MX teams of the Apertura 2018 classification table.

Teams

Draw
The draw for the tournament took place on 11 December 2018. 27 teams were drawn into nine groups of three, with each group containing one team from each of the three pots. Unlike other tournaments, the draw was carried out virtually, instead of being drawn from a pot.

Clubs in Pot 1 were drawn to be the seed of each group according to the order of their drawing. That is, the first club that was drawn is seed of Group 1, the second drawn is seed of Group 2 and so on and so on. The Liga MX teams in Pot 1 are the four best teams in the Apertura 2018 classification table not participating in the 2019 CONCACAF Champions League. The Apertura 2018 winner Cruz Azul (who is also first in classification table) is also in Pot 1. Pot 1 also contained the top four Ascenso MX teams in the Apertura 2018 classification table.

Pot 2 contained the next four best placed Liga MX clubs in the Apertura 2018 classification table not participating in the 2019 CONCACAF Champions League and Ascenso MX clubs who ended 5–9 in the Aggregate table.

'Pot 3 contains the next five best Liga MX clubs in the Apertura 2018 classification table not participating in the 2019 CONCACAF Champions League. Pot 3 also contains the Ascenso MX clubs who ended 10–13 in the Apertura 2018 classification table.

Tiebreakers
If two or more clubs are equal on points on completion of the group matches, the following criteria are applied to determine the rankings:

 scores of the group matches played among the clubs in question;
 superior goal difference;
 higher number of goals scored;
 higher number of goals scored away in the group matches played among the clubs in question;
 fair play ranking;
 drawing of lots.

Group stage
Every group is composed of three clubs, each group has at least one club from Liga MX and Ascenso MX.

All match times listed are CST (UTC–6), except for matches in Cancún (UTC–5), Ciudad Juárez, Culiacán, Hermosillo (all UTC–7) and Tijuana (UTC–8).

Group 1

Group 2

Group 3

Group 4

Group 5

Group 6

Group 7

Group 8

Group 9

Ranking of second-placed teams

Knockout stage
The clubs that advance to this stage will be ranked and seeded 1 to 16 based on performance in the group stage. In case of ties, the same tiebreakers used to rank the runners-up will be used.
All rounds are played in a single game. If a game ends in a draw, it will proceed directly to a penalty shoot-out. The highest seeded club will host each match, regardless of which division each club belongs. 
The winners of the groups and the seven best second place teams of each group will advance to the Knockout stage.

Qualified teams
The nine group winners and the seven best runners-up from the group stage qualify for the final stage.

Seeding

Bracket

Round of 16

Quarterfinals

Semifinals

Final

Top goalscorers
Players sorted first by goals scored, then by last name.

Television rights

  indicates the network showed at least one match involving the group.

Notes

References

External links
Official site

2018, 2
2018, 2
Copa Mx, 2
Copa Mx, 2